The Iberian emerald lizard (Lacerta schreiberi), also known commonly as Schreiber's green lizard, is a species of lizard in the family Lacertidae. The species is endemic to the Iberian Peninsula.

Etymology

The specific name, schreiberi, is in honor of Austrian zoologist Egid Schreiber (1836–1913), author of Herpetologia Europaea (1875).

It is known as Lagarto-de-água (water lizard) in Portuguese and lagarto verdinegro (green and black lizard) in Spanish.

Geographic range

Lacerta schreiberi is found in Portugal and Spain.

Habitat

The natural habitats of L. schreiberi are temperate forests and shrublands, Mediterranean-type shrubby vegetation, rivers, and pastureland.

Conservation status
Lacerta schreiberi is threatened by habitat loss.

Description

Diet
Lacerta schreiberi is mainly insectivorous, though it also preys on small lizards like the iberian wall lizard or large psammodromus.

Reproduction
Lacerta schreiberi is oviparous. Clutch size varies from 11 to 28 eggs.

References

Further reading
Arnold EN, Burton JA (1978). A Field Guide to Reptiles and Amphibians of Britain and Europe. London: Collins. 272 pp. + Plates 1-40. . (Lacerta schreiberi, p. 131 + Plate 20, figures 2a & 2b; Plate 22, figure 2 + Map 66).
Bedriaga J (1878). "Herpetologische Studien ". Archiv für Naturgeschichte 44 (1): 259–320. (Lacerta schreiberi, new species, pp. 299–303 + Plate X, figures 3 & 4). (in German and Latin).

Lacerta (genus)
Endemic reptiles of the Iberian Peninsula
Reptiles described in 1878
Taxa named by Jacques von Bedriaga
Taxonomy articles created by Polbot